Winfrey is a name. Notable people with the name include:

Surname
Amy Winfrey (born 1974), American animator, screenwriter, songwriter, and voice actress
Bill Winfrey (1916–1994), American Hall of Fame Thoroughbred racehorse trainer
Chuck Winfrey (born 1949), former linebacker in the National Football League
Oprah Winfrey (born 1954), American media proprietor, talk show host, actress, producer, and philanthropist
Perrion Winfrey (born 2000), American football player
Richard Winfrey (1858–1944), British Liberal politician, newspaper publisher and campaigner for agricultural rights
Travis Winfrey (born 1981), American actor

Given name
Winfrey Sanderson (born 1937), retired American college basketball coach

See also
Wifey (disambiguation)